Photoworks Annual is a British magazine which specialises in art photography, published by Photoworks.

The magazine was established in 2003 as Photoworks and was published biannually until 2013 when it became an annual publication and obtained its current name. The magazine is published by Photoworks, a Brighton based organization for contemporary photography. The magazine was edited by Gordon MacDonald until he stood down in 2011.

The magazine is supported by the Arts Council of England.

External links
 
 Review of inaugural new-format issue at Photomonitor

Annual magazines published in the United Kingdom
Biannual magazines published in the United Kingdom
Visual arts magazines published in the United Kingdom
English-language magazines
Magazines established in 2003
Photography magazines